Booker Mountain, also known as Mount Booker, with an elevation of , is located in the North Cascades of Washington, about 1.5 miles SE of Mount Buckner, between Park Creek and Stehekin River. It is named in honor of Booker T. Washington.

History

Landscape painter Abby Williams Hill, of Tacoma, Washington, was contracted by the Great Northern Railway Company to paint pictures of the North Cascades, and she first painted Mount Booker in 1903. At the time of Hill's painting, the mountain had not yet been named; newspaper critics called it "No-name mountain."

Abby Hill wrote to the National Geological Survey to determine the mountain's name, and the agency offered her the opportunity to name it. She had previously traveled to visit Booker T. Washington (d. 1915), and she attended his lectures in Tuskegee, Alabama, in the fall of 1901. She was also very moved by her experiences with Jim Crow laws in the South, as well as by Washington's lectures. As a result, Abby Hill named the mountain in honor of Booker T. Washington.

Climbing history
The first ascent of the Northeast Face of Mount Booker was completed by Dan Davis and John Holland on August 22, 1964.

Geology
The North Cascades features some of the most rugged topography in the Cascade Range with craggy peaks, ridges, and deep glacial valleys. Geological events occurring many years ago created the diverse topography and drastic elevation changes over the Cascade Range leading to the various climate differences. These climate differences lead to vegetation variety defining the ecoregions in this area.

The history of the formation of the Cascade Mountains dates back millions of years ago to the late Eocene Epoch. With the North American Plate overriding the Pacific Plate, episodes of volcanic igneous activity persisted.  In addition, small fragments of the oceanic and continental lithosphere called terranes created the North Cascades about 50 million years ago.

During the Pleistocene period dating back over two million years ago, glaciation advancing and retreating repeatedly scoured the landscape leaving deposits of rock debris. The “U”-shaped cross section of the river valleys are a result of recent glaciation. Uplift and faulting in combination with glaciation have been the dominant processes which have created the tall peaks and deep valleys of the North Cascades area.

See also

 List of things named after Booker T. Washington
 Geography of the North Cascades

Gallery

References

External links
 Weather forecast: Booker Mountain
 Mount Booker aerial photo: PBase

Mountains of Washington (state)
Mountains of Chelan County, Washington
Booker T. Washington
North Cascades National Park
North American 2000 m summits
North Cascades
Cascade Range